Siphonophorae (from Greek siphōn 'tube' + pherein 'to bear') is an order within Hydrozoa, which is a class of marine organisms within the phylum Cnidaria. According to the World Register of Marine Species, the order contains 175 species thus far. 

Although a siphonophore may appear to be an individual organism, they are highly polymorphic and complex organisms. https://doi.org/10.1016/S0065-2881(08)60074-7. (https://www.sciencedirect.com/science/article/pii/S0065288108600747 Each specimen is in fact a colonial organism composed of medusoid and polypoid zooids that are morphologically and functionally specialized. Zooids are multicellular units that develop from a single fertilized egg and combine to create functional colonies able to reproduce, digest, float, maintain body positioning, and use jet propulsion to move. Most colonies are long, thin, transparent floaters living in the pelagic zone.

Like other hydrozoans, some siphonophores emit light to attract and attack prey. While many sea animals produce blue and green bioluminescence, a siphonophore in the genus Erenna was only the second life form found to produce a red light (the first one being the scaleless dragonfish Chirostomias pliopterus).

Anatomy and morphology

Colony characteristics
Siphonophores are colonial hydrozoans that do not exhibit alternation of generations but instead reproduce asexually through a budding process. Zooids are the multicellular units that build the colonies. A single bud called the pro-bud initiates the growth of a colony by undergoing fission. Each zooid is produced to be genetically identical; however, mutations can alter their functions and increase diversity of the zooids within the colony. Siphonophores are unique in that the pro-bud initiates the production of diverse zooids with specific functions. The functions and organizations of the zooids in colonies widely vary among the different species; however, the majority of colonies are bilaterally arranged with dorsal and ventral sides to the stem. The stem is the vertical branch in the center of the colony to which the zooids attach. Zooids typically have special functions, and thus assume specific spatial patterns along the stem.

General morphology
Siphonophores typically exhibit one of the three standard body plans. The body plans are named Cystonecta, Physonecta, and Calycophorae. Cystonects have a long stem with the attached zooids. Each group of zooids has a gastrozooid. The gastrozooid has a tentacle used for capturing and digesting food. The groups also have gonophores, which are specialized for reproduction. They use a pneumatophore, a gas-filled float, on their anterior end and mainly drift at the surface of the water. Physonects have a pneumatophore and nectosome, which harbors the nectophores used for jet propulsion. The nectophores pump the water back in order to move forward. Calycophorans differ from cystonects and physonects in that they have two nectophores and no pneumatophore.

Since their origin, an increase in the number of zooid types has been observed in siphonophores. Scientists have determined two possible evolutionary hypothesis for this observation: 1. As time has gone on, the amount of zooid types has increased. 2. The last common ancestor had many types of zooids and the diversity seen today is due to loss of zooid types. Research shows no evidence supporting the first hypothesis, and has seen some evidence in support of the second.

Zooids
Siphonophores can have zooids that are either polyps or medusae. However, zooids are unique and can develop to have different functions.
Nectophores
Nectophores are medusae that assist in the propulsion and movement of some siphonophores in water. They are characteristic in physonectae and calycophores. The nectophores of these organisms are located in the nectosome where they can coordinate the swimming of colonies. The nectophores have also been observed in working in conjunction with reproductive structures in order to provide propulsion during colony detachment.
Bracts
Bracts are zooids that are unique to the siphonophorae order. They function in protection and maintaining a neutral buoyancy. However, bracts are not present in all species of siphonophore.
Gastrozooids
Gastrozooids are polyps that have evolved a function to assist in the feeding of siphonophores.
Palpons
Palpons are modified gastrozooids that function in digestion by regulating the circulation of gastrovascular fluids.
Gonophores
Gonophores are zooids that are involved in the reproductive processes of the siphonophores.
Pneumatophores
The presence of pneumatophores characterizes the subgroups Cystonectae and Physonectae. They are gas-filled floats that are located at the anterior end of the colonies in these species. They function to help the colonies maintain their orientation in water. In the cystonectae subgroup, the pneumatophores have an additional function of assisting with flotation of the organisms. The siphonophores exhibiting the feature develop the structure in early larval development via invaginations of the flattened planula structure. Further observations of the siphonophore species Nanomia bijuga indicate that the pneumatophore feature potentially also functions to sense pressure changes and regulate chemotaxis in some species.

Distribution and habitat
Currently, the World Register of Marine Species (WoRMS) identifies 175 species of siphonophores. They can differ greatly in terms of size and shape, which largely reflects the environment that they inhabit. Siphonophores are most often pelagic organisms, yet level species are benthic. Smaller, warm-water siphonophores typically live in the epipelagic zone and use their tentacles to capture zooplankton and copepods. Larger siphonophores live in deeper waters, as they are generally longer and more fragile and must avoid strong currents. They mostly feed on larger prey. The majority of siphonophores live in the deep sea and can be found in all of the oceans. Siphonophore species rarely only inhabit one location. Some species, however, can be confined to a specific range of depths and/or an area of the ocean.

Behavior

Movement
Siphonophores use a method of locomotion similar to jet propulsion. A siphonophore is a complex aggregate colony made up of many nectophores, which are clonal individuals that form by budding and are genetically identical. Depending on where each individual nectophore is positioned within the siphonophore, their function differs. Colonial movement is determined by individual nectophores of all developmental stages. The smaller individuals are concentrated towards the top of the siphonophore, and their function is turning and adjusting the orientation of the colony. Individuals will get larger the older they are. The larger individuals are located at the base of the colony, and their main function is thrust propulsion. These larger individuals are important in attaining the maximum speed of the colony. Every individual is key to the movement of the aggregate colony, and understanding their organization may allow us to make advances in our own multi-jet propulsion vehicles. The colonial organization of siphonophores, particularly in Nanomia bijuga confers evolutionary advantages. A large number of concentrated individuals allows for redundancy. This means that even if some individual nectophores become functionally compromised, their role is bypassed so the colony as a whole is not negatively affected. The velum, a thin band of tissue surrounding the opening of the jet, also plays a role in swimming patterns, shown specifically through research done on the previous mentioned species N. bijuga. The velum becomes smaller and more circular during times of forward propulsion compared to a large velum that is seen during refill periods. Additionally, the position of the velum changes with swimming behaviors; the velum is curved downward in times of jetting, but during refill, the velum is moved back into the nectophore. The siphonophore Namonia bijuga also practices diel vertical migration, as it remains in the deep-sea during the day but rises during the night.

Predation and feeding
Siphonophores are predatory carnivores. Their diets consist of a variety of copepods, small crustaceans, and small fish. Generally, the diets of strong swimming siphonophores consist of smaller prey, and the diets of weak swimming siphonophores consist of larger prey. A majority of siphonophores have gastrozooids that have a characteristic tentacle attached to the base of the zooid. This structural feature functions in assisting the organisms in catching prey. Species with large gastrozooids are capable of consuming a broad range of prey sizes. Similar to many other organisms in the phylum of Cnidaria, many siphonophore species exhibit nematocyst stinging capsules on branches of their tentacles called tentilla. The nematocysts are arranged in dense batteries on the side of the tentilla. When the siphonophore encounters potential prey, their tentillum react to where the  tentacles create a net by transforming their shape around the prey. The nematocysts then shoot millions of paralyzing, and sometimes fatal, toxin molecules at the trapped prey which is then transferred to the proper location for digestion. Some species of siphonophores use aggressive mimicry by using bioluminescent light so the prey cannot properly identify the predator.

There are four types of nematocysts in siphonophore tentilla: heteronemes, haplonemes, desmonemes, and rhopalonemes. Heteronemes are the largest nematocysts and are spines on a shaft close to tubules attached to the center of the siphonophore. Haplonemes have open-tipped tubules with spines, but no distinct shaft. This is the most common nematocyst among siphonophores. Desmonemes do not have spines but instead there are adhesive properties on the tubules to hold onto prey. Rhopalonemes are nematocysts with wide tubules for prey.

Due to the lack of food in the deep sea environment, a majority of siphonophore species function in a sit-and-wait tactic for food. The gelatinous body plan allows for flexibility when catching prey, but the gelatinous adaptations are based on habitat. They swim around waiting for their long tentacles to encounter prey. In addition, siphonophores in a group denoted Erenna have the ability to generate bioluminescence and red fluorescence while its tentilla twitches in a way to mimic motions of small crustaceans and copepods. These actions entice the prey to move closer to the siphonophore, allowing it to trap and digest it.

Reproduction
The modes of reproduction for siphonophores vary among the different species, and to this day, several modes remain unknown. Generally, a single zygote begins the formation of a colony of zooids. The fertilized egg matures into a protozooid, which initiates the budding process and creation of a new zooid. This process repeats until a colony of zooids forms around the central stalk. In contrast, several species reproduce using polyps. Polyps can hold eggs and/or sperm and can be released into the water from the posterior end of the siphonophore. The polyps may then be fertilized outside of the organism.

Siphonophores use gonophores to make the reproductive gametes. Gonophores are either male or female; however, the types of gonophores in a colony can vary among species. Species are characterized as monoecious or dioecious based on their gonophores. Monoecious species contain male and female gonophores in a single zooid colony, whereas dioecious species harbor male and female gonophores separately in different colonies of zooids.

Bioluminescence

Nearly all siphonophores have bioluminescent capabilities. Since these organisms are extremely fragile, they are rarely observed alive. Bioluminescence in siphonophores has been thought to have evolved as a defense mechanism. Siphonophores of the deep-sea genus Erenna (found at depths between 1,600-2,300 meters) are thought to use their bioluminescent capability for offense too, as a lure to attract fish. This genus is one of the few to prey on fish rather than crustaceans. The bioluminescent organs, called tentilla, on these non-visual individuals emit red fluorescence along with a rhythmic flicking pattern, which attracts prey as it resembles smaller organisms such as zooplankton and copepods. Thus, it has been concluded that they use luminescence as a lure to attract prey. Some research indicates that deep-sea organisms can not detect long wavelengths, and red light has a long wavelength of 680 nm. If this is the case, then fish are not lured by Erenna, and there must be another explanation. However, the deep-sea remains largely unexplored and red light sensitivity in fish such as Cyclothone and the deep myctophid fish should not be discarded.

Bioluminescent lures are found in many different species of siphonophores, and are used for a variety of reasons. Species such as Agalma okeni, Athorybia rosacea, Athorybia lucida, and Lychnafalma utricularia use their lures as a mimicry device to attract prey. A. rosacea mimic fish larvae, A. lucida are thought to mimic larvacean houses, and L. utricularia mimic hydromedusa. The species Resomia ornicephala uses their green and blue fluorescing tentilla to attract krill, helping them to outcompete other organisms that are hunting for the same prey. Siphonophores from the genus Erenna use bioluminescent lures surrounded by red fluorescence to attract prey and possibly mimic a fish from the Cyclothone genus. Their prey is lured in through a unique flicking behavior associated with the tentilla. When young, the tentilla of organisms in the Erenna genus contain only bioluminescent tissue, but, as the organism ages, red fluorescent material is also present in these tissues.

Taxonomy

Organisms in the order of Siphonophorae have been classified into the phylum Cnidaria and the class Hydrozoa. The phylogenetic relationships of siphonophores have been of great interest due to the high variability of the organization of their polyp colonies and medusae. Once believed to be a highly distinct group, larval similarities and morphological features have led researchers to believe that siphonophores had evolved from simpler colonial hydrozoans similar to those in the orders Anthoathecata and Leptothecata. Consequently, they are now united with these in the subclass Hydroidolina.

Early analysis divided siphonophores into 3 main subgroups based on the presence or the absence of 2 different traits: swimming bells (nectophores) and floats (pneumatophores). The subgroups consisted of Cystonectae, Physonectae, and Calycorphores. Cystonectae had pneumatophores, physonectae had nectophores, and calycophores had both.

Eukaryotic nuclear small subunit ribosomal gene 18S, eukaryotic mitochondrial large subunit ribosomal gene 16S, and transcriptome analyses further support the phylogenetic division of Siphonophorae into 2 main clades: Cystonectae and Codonophora. Suborders within Codonophora include Physonectae (consisting of the clades Calycophorae and Euphysonectae), Pyrostephidae, and Apolemiidae.

Suborder Calycophorae
Abylidae Agassiz, 1862
Clausophyidae Totton, 1965
Diphyidae Quoy & Gaimard, 1827
Hippopodiidae Kölliker, 1853
Prayidae Kölliker, 1853
Sphaeronectidae Huxley, 1859
Tottonophyidae Pugh, Dunn & Haddock, 2018
Suborder Cystonectae
Physaliidae Brandt, 1835
Rhizophysidae Brandt, 1835
Suborder Physonectae
Agalmatidae Brandt, 1834
Apolemiidae Huxley, 1859
Cordagalmatidae Pugh, 2016
Erennidae Pugh, 2001
Forskaliidae Haeckel, 1888
Physophoridae Eschscholtz, 1829
Pyrostephidae Moser, 1925
Resomiidae Pugh, 2006
Rhodaliidae Haeckel, 1888
Stephanomiidae Huxley, 1859

History

Discovery
Carl Linnaeus described the first siphonophore, the Portuguese man o' war, in 1758. The discovery rate of siphonophore species was slow in the 18th century, as only four additional species were found. During the 19th century, 56 new species were observed due to research voyages conducted by European powers. The majority of new species found during this time period were collected in coastal, surface waters. During the HMS Challenger expedition, various species of siphonophores were collected. Ernst Haeckel attempted to conduct a write up of all of the species of siphonophores collected on this expedition. He introduced 46 "new species"; however, his work was heavily critiqued because some of the species that he identified were eventually found not to be siphonophores. Nonetheless, some of his descriptions and figures (pictured below) are considered useful by modern biologists. A rate of about 10 new species discoveries per decade was observed during the 20th century. Considered the most important researcher of siphonophores, A. K. Totton introduced 23 new species of siphonophores during the mid-20th century.

On April 6, 2020, the Schmidt Ocean Institute announced the discovery of a giant Apolemia siphonophore in submarine canyons near Ningaloo Coast, measuring 15 m (49 ft) diameter with a ring approximately 47 m (154 ft) long, possibly the largest siphonophore ever recorded.

There is no fossil record of siphonophores, though they have evolved and adapted for an extensive time period. Their phylum, Cnidaria, is an ancient lineage that dates back to c. 640 million years ago.

Haeckel's siphonophores
Ernst Haeckel described numerous siphonophores, and several plates from his Kunstformen der Natur (1904) depict members of the taxon:

References

Further reading

 PinkTentacle.com (2008): Siphonophore: Deep-sea superorganism (video). Retrieved 2009-MAY-23.

External links

''Deep sea siphonophore'' (10 April 2017) YouTube. Imaged by the NOAA Okeanos Explorer on March 14, 2017 at 1,560 meters west of Winslow Reef complex. Retrieved 28 January 2018. 

 
Articles containing video clips
Hydroidolina
Cnidarian orders